Robert Houston Noble (November 3, 1861 – October 26, 1939) was a career officer in the United States Army. A veteran of the Apache Wars, Spanish–American War, Philippine–American War, Pancho Villa Expedition, and World War I, he attained the rank of brigadier general and was most notable for his World War I command of the 158th Infantry Brigade.

Early life
Robert H. Noble was born in Federalsburg, Maryland on November 3, 1861, a son of Dr. William A. Noble and Mary A. (Houston) Noble. He attended the public schools of Carroll County and the State Model School in Trenton, New Jersey. In 1880, he began attendance at the United States Military Academy, and he graduated in 1884 ranked 32 of 37.

Start of career
After graduation, Noble received his commission as a second lieutenant in the 1st Infantry Regiment and was posted to Fort Bowie and Fort Lowell, Arizona. In 1885 and 1886, he took part in the expedition to capture Geronimo during the Apache Wars. In July 1886, his regiment was transferred to California, and Noble served first at Angel Island, and later at Benicia Barracks.

In September 1890, Noble was assigned as professor of military science at St. John's College in Annapolis, Maryland. While serving at St. John's, Noble received an LL.B. degree from the University of Maryland School of Law in 1892 and the honorary Master of Arts degree from St. John's in 1894. Noble was admitted to the bar after completing his legal education, but he opted to continue his military career.

Noble rejoined the 1st Infantry in November 1894, and served at Angel Island, Benicia Barracks and in San Diego as commander of Companies D, B, and H, then became the regimental adjutant at the Presidio of San Francisco. In April 1897 he was appointed aide-de-camp to William Rufus Shafter, then commander of the Department of California.

Spanish–American War
When Shafter was named to command the Fifth Army Corps during the Spanish–American War in 1898, Noble continued to serve with Shafter. During the war, Noble took part in combat in and around Santiago, and on four occasions he was selected to enter Spanish lines and conduct negotiations under a flag of truce.

After the Spanish surrender, the Fifth Corps was stationed at Montauk and Governors Island. Noble continued to serve as Shafter's aide and assisted in the preparation of the corps' official report of its wartime activities.

Philippine–American War
In January 1899, Noble joined the headquarters staff of the Department of California in San Francisco. He served successively as the department's judge advocate, inspector of small arms, and inspector general.

Noble was posted to the Philippines in September 1899. He served as adjutant of 2d Brigade, 1st Division, Eighth Corps, which was commanded by Frederick Dent Grant, followed by assignment as adjutant of the Department of the Visayas, which was commanded by Robert Patterson Hughes. He next served as adjutant for U.S. troops in Cebu during the military governorship of Simon Snyder. He then served as adjutant of the Department of South Philippines under the command of Edward Settle Godfrey and then served again as adjutant of the Department of the Visayas, which was commanded by Frank Baldwin.

During his service in the Philippines, Noble took part in campaigns in Luzon, Panay, and Samar. In addition, while serving as adjutant in Visayas, Noble accepted the surrender of several Filipino insurgents as Hughes' representative.

Continued career
Noble continued to serve in the Philippines. From October 1902 to February 1908 he served as military aide to the Governor-General of the Philippines, a period which included the governorships of William Howard Taft, Luke Edward Wright, Henry Clay Ide, and James Francis Smith. When Taft led a U.S. goodwill mission to Japan in 1905, Noble accompanied him as the representative of the Philippine government. Noble performed a similar duty when Taft led missions to Hong Kong in 1907. When Leonard Wood left the Philippines in early 1908 following his command of the Philippine Division, Noble was assigned as his aide on Wood's extended voyage to the United States, which included an observation tour of military site and units in Singapore, Ceylon, Aden, Egypt, Malta, and several European countries.

In June 1908, Noble rejoined the 1st Infantry Regiment at Vancouver Barracks, Washington and assumed command of the regiment's 3rd Battalion. He served with the 1st Infantry until December 1910, and his responsibilities included an inspection tour of Army sites in Alaska. From January to August 1911, Noble was a student at the Fort Leavenworth, Kansas Field Officers Course (now the United States Army Command and General Staff College. From August 1911 to August 1912, he was a student at the United States Army War College.

In the fall of 1912, Noble was assigned to temporary duty as an umpire during war games held in Hawaii. In December 1912, he was assigned to the 12th Infantry at the Presidio of Monterey, California. In February 1913, he was promoted to lieutenant colonel and assigned detached duty in San Francisco as supervisor of National Guard affairs for the Western Department. From August 1914 to October 1916, Noble commanded the 22nd Infantry Regiment, which was based in Texas City, Texas while patrolling the U.S.-Mexico border, and later based in Arizona. Noble was promoted to colonel in July 1916.

In November 1916, Noble assumed command of the 6th Infantry Regiment, which was stationed in Chihuahua, Mexico during the Pancho Villa Expedition. He continued in command after the regiment left Mexico for Fort Bliss, Texas, and then led it to Chickamauga, Georgia where it took part in increased training to prepare for U.S. entry into World War I.

World War I

As part of the 5th Division, the 6th Infantry arrived in France as part of the American Expeditionary Forces (AEF) in March 1918. The next month, Noble was promoted to brigadier general and he served with the 30th and 77th Divisions, including several days as acting commander of the 30th Division. After observing British units on the front near Albert and Béthune, he served with the 77th Division as an observer in the Baccarat sector during the Aisne-Marne Offensive.

In August, Noble was assigned to command the 158th Infantry Brigade, a unit of the 79th Division, commanded by Major General Joseph E. Kuhn. He led his brigade during the start of the Franco-American Meuse–Argonne offensive in late September, but was relieved because his division commander, Major General Kuhn, together with the inspector general of the AEF, Major General Andre W. Brewster, were dissatisfied with his performance. Noble was then assigned to staff duty with the AEF Services of Supply.

Following the end of the war in November 1918, Noble reverted to his permanent rank of colonel, and he commanded the AEF's Monte Carlo Leave Area until February 1919.

Later career

In March 1919, Noble returned to the United States and was assigned as head of National Guard affairs for the Ninth Corps Area in San Francisco. He continued to serve in this position until he retired in December 1922.

After his retirement, Noble was awarded the Silver Star to recognize his heroism at the Siege of Santiago during the Spanish–American War. In 1930, the U.S. Congress passed legislation enabling World War I general officers to retire at their highest wartime rank, and Noble was promoted to brigadier general on the Army's retired list.

Retirement and death
In retirement, Noble was a resident of San Francisco. He was active in the affairs of the Episcopal church, and was a member of several church-related committees and delegate to several church conventions. He was also active in the Society of Indian Wars, Veterans of the Philippines, and Military Order of Foreign Wars. In addition, Noble also became involved in the activities of the California Bar Association and American Bar Association, and also served on the board of directors of the San Francisco chapter of the American Red Cross.

Noble was fluent in Spanish and French, and also composed church music, and in retirement he devoted time to improving these skills. He died in San Francisco on October 26, 1939. Noble was buried at Cypress Lawn Memorial Park in Colma, California.

Family
In 1921, Noble married Ethel Elizabeth (Dimond) Sherwood, a widow. She was the mother of two children, William R. Sherwood II and Beth Sherwood.

Dates of rank
Noble's effective dates of rank were:

Second lieutenant, June 15, 1884
First lieutenant, June 15, 1891
Major (temporary), June 20, 1898
Captain, October 12, 1898
Major (temporary), September 5, 1899
Captain, June 30, 1901
Major, October 4, 1907
Lieutenant colonel, February 1, 1913
Colonel, July 1, 1916
Brigadier general (temporary), April 12, 1918
Colonel, November 12, 1918
Colonel (Retired list), December 12, 1912
Brigadier general (retired list), June 21, 1930

References

External links

Sources

Books

Magazines

Newspapers

1861 births
1939 deaths
United States Army Infantry Branch personnel
People from Carroll County, Maryland
People from San Francisco
United States Military Academy alumni
University of Maryland Francis King Carey School of Law alumni
United States Army Command and General Staff College alumni
United States Army War College alumni
Recipients of the Silver Star
United States Army personnel of the Indian Wars
American military personnel of the Spanish–American War
American military personnel of the Philippine–American War
United States Army generals of World War I
Burials at Cypress Lawn Memorial Park
United States Army generals
Military personnel from Maryland